João Cleofas Martins, his nickname Djunga Fotógrafo (28 August 1901 in the island of São Vicente–27 August 1970 in Mindelo, São Vicente) was a Cape Verdean photographer and author.

Biography
He was born in the island of Sāo Vicente, just shortly after Sergio Frusoni. His father came from the island of Brava and he lived most of his life in Mindelo on the island of São Vicente.

He was one of a few Cape Verdean authors who criticized the government of the second Republic of Portugal.

He worked at the Western Telegraph Company (now Western Union), he went to Lisbon in 1928 and took part in photography.  He founded "Foto Progresso" in Mindelo back home in 1931.

He had taken pictures mainly around the island, one of the most important photos was Lajinha taken in 1938.

He dedicated all of his life to the children's home at the old Albergue de S. Vicente (now Lar de Nhô Djunga).  As Sergio Frusoni, he was a chronicler at the Radio Barlavento in Mindelo.

He died on August 27, 1970, just a day before his 70th birthday.

Legacy
Along with Cesária Évora and Bana, Martins were one of the most important persons in Mindelo.

A street named after the writer is located north of Mindelo slightly northeast of the city center.

Theatrical Works
 Vai-te Treinando desde Já, a theatrical piece, written in 1960, written about the problems of Portuguese colonial rule

External links
Nhô Djunga 
Photo of Lajinha in 1938 by João Cleófas Martins at Saial 

1901 births
1970 deaths
Cape Verdean male writers
People from Mindelo
Writers from São Vicente, Cape Verde
Cape Verdean dramatists and playwrights
Male dramatists and playwrights
20th-century dramatists and playwrights
20th-century male writers